In topology, a branch of mathematics, an excisive triad is a triple  of topological spaces such that A, B are subspaces of X and X is the union of the interior of A and the interior of B. Note B is not required to be a subspace of A.

See also 
Homotopy excision theorem

Notes

References 
 
Munkres, James; Topology, Prentice Hall; 2nd edition (December 28, 1999). .

Topology
General topology